Espostoa is a genus of columnar cacti, comprising 16 species known from the Andes of southern Ecuador and Peru. It usually lives at an altitude of between 800m and 2500m. Its fruit is edible, sweet, and juicy. The genus is named after Nicolas E. Esposto, a renowned botanist from Lima.

These candle-like cacti are covered with spines and white hair. Only the older specimens can divide. In adulthood, a cephalium sometimes appears, similar to the Mexican genus Cephalocereus.

They were discovered by Alexander von Humboldt and Aimé Bonpland in the early nineteenth century.

They are appreciated for their decorative qualities due to their white fleece. They can be propagated by seed. 
For full development they must be planted in the ground. The cultivated specimens very rarely flourish.

Like all cacti, Espostoa requires a sunny location and well-drained soil. But in summer, it appreciates fertilizer and wetter conditions. In winter, it needs a rest, but the temperature must not drop below 12 °C.

Taxonomy

Species list

Synonyms
The following genera or species have been included in this genus:
Pilocereus dautwitzii
Binghamia Britton & Rose
Pseudoespostoa Backeb.
Thrixanthocereus Backeb.
Vatricania Backeb.

Bibliography 
 Innes C, Wall B (1995).  Cacti' Succulents and Bromaliads.  Cassell & The Royal Horticultural Society.
 Edward F. Anderson : "The Cactus Family" (2001)

External links 

  photos onr www.cactiguide.com
  Espostoa guentheri

Trichocereeae
Cacti of South America
Flora of Ecuador
Flora of Peru
Flora of the Andes
Cactoideae genera